Platydoris ocellata is a species of sea slug, a dorid nudibranch, shell-less marine opisthobranch gastropod mollusks in the family Discodorididae.

Distribution
This species was described from North Moa Island, Indonesia. It is reported from Papua New Guinea, the Philippines, Sulawesi and the Solomon Islands.

References

Discodorididae
Gastropods described in 2002